People's Party was a liberal political party in Pahlavi era Iran. It was one of two major parties in the apparent attempt to decree a two-party system by Mohammad Reza Shah, apparently opposition to the ruling New Iran Party and previously Nationalists' Party. The party was dissolved in 1975, in order to be merged into the newly founded Resurgence Party, the only legal party in the Shah's attempted single-party system.

Leadership

Electoral history

Reception 
The party was often criticized for its "lethargic, belated and disorganized" election campaigns, as well as being incapable of preparing a viable alternative to the New Iran Party's platform, thus blamed for the latter's continuing domination of the political scene.

American diplomat Andrew Killgore, described the party "made up of cliques of followers of a few competing leaders who cooperate with one another for personal and pragmatic reasons but not out of any sense of party unity", what he calls a "traditional Iranian political party".

In popular culture 
According to Ervand Abrahamian, People's Party and New Iran Party were interchangeably called "Yes Sir, Party" and "Yes of Course Sir, Party" by people, as members of the two parties in the National Consultative Assembly were assigned to their affiliation by Shah and with the help of SAVAK.

References 

1957 establishments in Iran
Political parties established in 1957
1975 disestablishments in Iran
Political parties disestablished in 1975
Monarchist parties in Iran
Political parties in Pahlavi Iran (1941–1979)
Liberal parties in Iran